Nazarbayev University (NU) is an autonomous research university in Astana, the capital of Kazakhstan. Founded as a result of the initiative of the first President of Kazakhstan, Nursultan Nazarbayev in 2010 (June),  it is an English-medium institution, with an international faculty and staff.

The university management bodies are the Executive Board, Board of Trustees and the Supreme Board of Trustees. The Chairman of the Supreme Board of Trustees is the former President of the Republic of Kazakhstan, Nursultan Nazarbayev.

History 
On October 17, 2009, the strategy for the 2010–2012 university development was approved, during the first meeting of the New University of Astana's Board of Directors.

In June 2010, in accordance with government decree, the university changed its name to Nazarbayev University.

In Fall 2010, admission to Nazarbayev University's Foundation Program began.

On December 22, 2010, Majilis approved a bill on Nazarbayev University's status.

On January 19, 2011, the President of Kazakhstan signed the Law of the Republic of Kazakhstan on Nazarbayev University's status, Nazarbayev Intellectual Schools, and Nazarbayev Fund.

On June 15, 2011, Nazarbayev University changed its legal status and was renamed Autonomous organization of education Nazarbayev University. The university uses its own educational standards, and is not administered by the Ministry of Education and Science of the Republic of Kazakhstan. The activity of the university is regulated by the special Law of the Republic of Kazakhstan on Nazarbayev University's status, Nazarbayev Intellectual Schools and Nazarbayev Fund.

In 2012, Opening of the Graduate School of Education and the Graduate School of Public Policy.

In 2013, the launch of the Executive MBA program at the Graduate School of Business.

In June 2015, Nazarbayev University celebrated its first graduation ceremony. 380 Bachelor's Degree graduates and 142 Master's Degree graduates received Nazarbayev University diplomas.

In September 2015, the Nazarbayev University School of Medicine opened with the first admission of students to its M.D. program.

On December 24, 2015, in accordance with Article 3 of the Law of the Republic of Kazakhstan dated February 18, 2011, "On Science", the Decree of the President of the Republic of Kazakhstan dated December 7, 2010 No. 1118 "On approval of the State of Kazakhstan education development program for 2011–2020," the Government of the Republic of Kazakhstan autonomous organization education "Nazarbayev University" was awarded the research university status. Additionally, the university research development program autonomous organization of education "Nazarbayev University" for 2016–2020 years was approved.

In September 2017, School of Mining and Geosciences was opened.

Launch of Asian Universities Alliance was in 2017. European University Association's Independent external evaluation of NU was published in 2017.

In 2019, the restructuring of the School of Engineering, School of Sciences and Technologies and the School Humanities and Social Sciences was implemented. New Schools were founded: the School of Engineering and Digital Sciences and The School of Sciences and Humanities.

In February 2020, BALEAP has affirmed full accreditation of NUFYP EAP program of NU Center for Preparatory Studies. The Graduate School of Public Policy (GSPP) Masters programs are fully accredited by the European Association for Public Administration Accreditation (EAPAA) in 2020.

In 2021, University Medical Center was accredited by JCI as a single Medical Center. NU got Full membership in the European University Association and the European Network for Academic Integrity.

Programs

Nazarbayev University Foundation Year Program (NUFYP)
One-year intensive foundation course of the NU Center for Preparatory Studies for entering the Nazarbayev University bachelor's degree programs
The program provides an intensive academic, scientific and language proficiency preparation to the undergraduate programs of Nazarbayev University. Education under “Nazarbayev University” state grant, as well as tuition based education are available for this program.

Undergraduate programs 
School of Mining and Geosciences (SMG) 

 BSc in Geology
 BSc in Petroleum Engineering
 BSc in Mining Engineering

School of Engineering and Digital Sciences (SEDS) 

 Mechanical and Aerospace Engineering
 Chemical Engineering and Materials Science 
 Electrical and Computer  Engineering
 Civil and Environmental Engineering 
 Computer Science
 Robotics and Mechatronics

School of Sciences and Humanities (SSH) 
 Economics
 Political Science & International Relations
 Sociology
 Anthropology
 History
 World Languages and Literature
 Chemistry
 Physics
 Biological Sciences
 Mathematics

School of Medicine (SoM) 
 Nursing Program (BSN)
 Nursing
 Nursing Professional Development Program (PDP)
 Medical sciences

Master's and doctorate programs 
Graduate School of Education 
Graduate School of Public Policy 
Graduate School of Business 
School of Engineering and Digital Sciences
School of Sciences and Humanities
School of Medicine
School of Mining and Geosciences

Professional development programs 
Executive Education programs for top and mid-level managers
Professional Development Programs at the Graduate School of Education
Professional Development Program for public sector professionals

Library 
Since opening in the Fall of 2010, The Nazarbayev University Library provides access to information, technology, reference help and programming to support the learning, teaching, and research of students, Faculty, and staff.

Access to information

Nazarbayev University Library provides access to a wide range of electronic and printed resources: 
 Print Books and e-books
 Audiobooks
 Print periodicals and e-journals
 DVDs
 Encyclopedias
 Dictionaries
 Central Asian newspaper microforms up to 1860s
The Library supports the language of instruction of the institution by providing a mostly English language collection. To support local culture and interests, the library has a growing collection of Kazakh and Russian literature.

The Library develops the collection according to requests from the Nazarbayev University community and Subject Librarians. Nazarbayev University Library subscribes to more than 60 databases providing access to hundreds of books, thousands of journals and millions of articles. The University of Wisconsin–Madison provides an Interlibrary Loan service for Faculty to request materials not available through the databases.

Nazarbayev University Repository

Nazarbayev University Repository is an institutional electronic archive for long-term storage, accumulation and provision for reliable open access to scientific research results and intellectual products of the Nazarbayev University community. The Repository is an opportunity for faculty, researchers, and graduate students to increase the web visibility and citation count of articles and thesis.

Technology

The Library provides computer workstations, scanners, and assistive learning technologies (Magnifier, JAWS, Braille Translator) to community members with physical and learning disabilities. Also available are E-readers.

Subject and reference librarians

Assigned to each School and Research Center is a personal Librarian that acts as a liaison between the community and the Library. Reference Librarians offer workshops, classroom instruction, and LibGuides to promote information literacy, technology, database training, citations, plagiarism, and much more.

Programming

Throughout the year, the Nazarbayev University Library acts as a consulting and training center for Kazakhstani Librarians by offering workshops, training, seminars, and webinars. The Library holds an annual seminar as a part of Eurasian Higher Education Leaders Forum (EHELF). The Library is an active member of Kazakhstan Association of University Libraries and promotes professional development for Academic Librarians.

Research
One of the strategic goals of Nazarbayev University (NU) is to build leading Research University, to give Kazakhstan and the world top level scientists, academics, leaders and entrepreneurs. NU aims to be a model for higher education reform and modern research in Kazakhstan and establish Astana as an international research and innovation center. Research funding supported through internal research programs, sponsored funds, national and international grants. All faculty members are expected to be equally excellent teachers and world class researchers. 
Office of the Provost (OoP) is administrating Research Council and its 7 Committees, which serve as the advisory bodies on all research-related issues: Bio and Chemical Safety Committee (BCSC), Institutional Animal Care and Use Committee (IACUC), Institutional Research Ethics Committee (IREC), Intellectual Property Committee (IPС), Equipment Committee (EC), Research Space Allocation Committee (RSAC), Allocations Committee.

Research performance

The overall research performance of the NU faculty and researchers produced over the last 2011 to 2023 years:
 340 researchers (faculty and staff in research centers);
 6900 publications during 2011-2023 (Scival);
 >270 research and teaching laboratories;
 175 patent applications;
 7 signed license agreements;
 123 patents.

In addition to the research conducted in the schools by faculty, staff and students, Nazarbayev University is home to:

National Laboratory Astana (NLA)
Nazarbayev University Research and Innovation System (NURIS)
Institute of Smart Systems and Artificial Intelligence

The main goals of NLA is carrying out multidisciplinary basic and/or applied research in the field of life sciences, energy, and other interdisciplinary areas of science, as well as activities to establish a scientific laboratory, experimental bases, centers, institutes for the development and implementation of scientific, scientific and technical, educational programs and training.

NURIS is an Innovation Cluster of Nazarbayev University.

Institute of Smart Systems and Artificial Intelligence (ISSAI) was founded in September 2019 to serve as the driver of research and innovation in the digital sphere of Kazakhstan with the focus on AI research. Located at the C4 Research Building of Nazarbayev University, ISSAI conducts interdisciplinary research on machine intelligence for solving real-world problems of industry and society.

ISSAI aims to develop a national capacity for research in Artificial Intelligence incorporating the experience of exemplars from Asia, Europe and the United States.

ISSAI provides an agile framework for research, innovation and collaboration with national and international partners in education, industry and government and contributes to the digital ecosystem of Kazakhstan in the advancement of national development goals.

Management 
In compliance with the Law of the Republic of Kazakhstan dated January 19, 2011 “On the status of “Nazarbayev University”, “Nazarbayev Intellectual schools” and “Nazarbayev Fund”, the governance bodies of Nazarbayev University are as follows:

Supreme Board of Trustees
Board of Trustees of the University
Executive bodies of the University

The Supreme Board of Trustees is the highest governance body of the University, Intellectual Schools and the Fund, which is headed by the Leader of the Nation, Nursultan Nazarbayev.

The competences of the Supreme Board of Trustees include the approval of a long-term development strategy and charter of the University, Intellectual Schools and the Fund; approval of a procedure for asset management; composing Boards of Trustees of the University, Intellectual Schools and the Fund.

The Board of Trustees of the University is the governance body that is in charge of general management of the University's activities.

NU governing structure

Leadership 
President - Shigeo Katsu

Board of Trustees of the University

NU Campus infrastructure

6,811 students, 1,193 staff
Over 20 buildings in use
Over 270 research and teaching labs
Technopark

References

2009 establishments in Kazakhstan
Educational institutions established in 2009
Universities in Kazakhstan
Universities in Astana
Nursultan Nazarbayev